This is a list of the National Register of Historic Places listings in Guadalupe Mountains National Park.

This is intended to be a complete list of the properties and districts on the National Register of Historic Places in Guadalupe Mountains National Park, located in Culberson and Hudspeth counties in Texas. There are two districts and four individual properties listed on the National Register within the park.

Current listings 
The publicly disclosed locations of National Register properties and districts may be seen in a mapping service provided.

|}

See also 

 National Register of Historic Places listings in Culberson County, Texas
 National Register of Historic Places listings in Hudspeth County, Texas
 National Register of Historic Places listings in Texas

References

External links 

Guadalupe Mountains National Park